One Wide River To Cross is an album by the progressive bluegrass band Country Gentlemen, recorded in 1971.

Track listing

 One Wide River to Cross 		 
 Born Again 		 
 Heaven 		 
 On The Sunny Side of Life 		 
 Gone Home 		 
 Little White Church 		 
 I Am a Pilgrim 		 
 Rank Strangers 		 
 He Will Set Your Fields on Fire 		 
 Weapon of Prayer 		 
 I'm Using My Bible for a Roadmap 		 
 Are You Washed in the Blood

Personnel
 Charlie Waller - guitar, vocals
 Jimmy Gaudreau - mandolin, vocals
 Bill Emerson - banjo, vocals
 Bill Yates - bass

References

External links
 https://web.archive.org/web/20091215090142/http://www.lpdiscography.com/c/Cgentlemen/cgent.htm

1971 albums
Rebel Records albums
The Country Gentlemen albums